Pleasant Hill is a city in Cass and Jackson counties, Missouri, United States. The population was 8,113 at the 2010 census. It is part of the Kansas City metropolitan area.

Pleasant Hill is home for the National Weather Service Kansas City/Pleasant Hill, Missouri office, which serves 37 counties in northern and western Missouri and seven counties in extreme east-central Kansas.

History 
Pleasant Hill was platted in 1844 by William Wright and was recorded as the "Original Town of Pleasant Hill."  Wright and Methodist circuit rider William Ferrell operated a mercantile store.  The original location was on a ridge near Pleasant Hill Cemetery. The community was named after its "pleasant situation on an elevated prairie". Wright also operated a 3-story tavern that was marked by a 12-foot high beacon atop a pole. It was an overnight stop for stagecoaches between Lexington, Missouri and Fort Scott, Kansas.

During the American Civil War and the run-up to it in the 1860s, Pleasant Hill was bitterly divided between the factions and was subject to numerous bushwhacking incidents.  The most notable incidents involved the congregations of the Christian and Presbyterian churches which were built side by side on High Street.  The Presbyterian Church was burnt in the process.  In 1863 all residents in the area were forced to move from the community in General Order No. 11 (1863).

In 1865 after residents were able to return the city center moved one mile southwest down the hill to the railhead of the Pacific Railroad (the original town site is still within the city limits the area is now called "Old Town"). The new city center was lower than the original and adjoins Big Creek.

The Pleasant Hill Downtown Historic District was listed on the National Register of Historic Places in 1994.

The Pleasant Hill Historical Society Museum, outside that district, but in a building that incorporates elements of other historic buildings, is a museum covering the town's history.

In 2016 the former Pacific Railroad line (which was later owned by the Rock Island Railroad) was converted to the western terminus of the 47-mile-long Rock Island Trail State Park (Missouri) and connects the Rails to Trails to the 240-mile-long Katy Trail State Park.

Geography 
Pleasant Hill is located in northeastern Cass County at the intersection of Missouri routes 7 and 58 approximately ten miles north-northeast of Harrisonville. Lee's Summit is ten miles to the northwest in adjacent Jackson County. Big Creek flows past the west margin of the city.

Demographics

2010 census 
As of the census of 2010, there were 8,113 people, 2,959 households, and 2,196 families living in the city. The racial makeup of the city was 95.3% White, 0.7% African American, 0.5% Native American, 0.5% Asian, 0.1% Pacific Islander, 1.2% from other races, and 1.7% from two or more races. Hispanic or Latino of any race were 3.7% of the population.

There were 2,959 households, of which 42.7% had children under the age of 18 living with them, 56.3% were married couples living together, 13.2% had a female householder with no husband present, 4.7% had a male householder with no wife present, and 25.8% were non-families. 21.5% of all households were made up of individuals, and 8.8% had someone living alone who was 65 years of age or older. The average household size was 2.71 and the average family size was 3.13.

The median age in the city was 33.7 years. 29.5% of residents were under the age of 18; 8.2% were between the ages of 18 and 24; 28.8% were from 25 to 44; 21.9% were from 45 to 64; and 11.7% were 65 years of age or older. The gender makeup of the city was 48.4% male and 51.6% female.

2000 census 
At the 2000 census, there were 5,582 people, 2,070 households and 1,509 families living in the city. The population density was 1,242.3 per square mile (480.0/km). There were 2,202 housing units at an average density of 490.1 per square mile (189.4/km). The racial makeup of the city was 97.55% White, 0.21% African American, 0.34% Native American, 0.38% Asian, 0.45% from other races, and 1.07% from two or more races. Hispanic or Latino of any race were 1.58% of the population.

There were 2,070 households, of which 40.7% had children under the age of 18 living with them, 58.6% were married couples living together, 10.3% had a female householder with no husband present, and 27.1% were non-families. 22.7% of all households were made up of individuals, and 9.4% had someone living alone who was 65 years of age or older. The average household size was 2.66 and the average family size was 3.12.

Age distribution was 30.2% under the age of 18, 8.0% from 18 to 24, 31.9% from 25 to 44, 18.6% from 45 to 64, and 11.3% who were 65 years of age or older. The median age was 33 years. For every 100 females, there were 94.4 males. For every 100 females age 18 and over, there were 89.0 males.

The median household income was $48,915, and the median family income was $52,799. Males had a median income of $40,394 versus $24,985 for females. The per capita income for the city was $21,623. About 4.0% of families and 5.5% of the population were below the poverty line, including 5.1% of those under age 18 and 5.2% of those age 65 or over.

Education 
Pleasant Hill is the strongest contributor to the Pleasant Hill R-3 School District, which also includes students from the surrounding areas of Strasburg, East Lynne, and portions of unincorporated Cass County.

Primary School K-2
 Pleasant Hill

Elementary School (3-4)
 Pleasant Hill

Intermediate School (5-6);
 Pleasant Hill

Middle School (7-8)
 Pleasant Hill Middle School

High School
 Pleasant Hill High School

Pleasant Hill has a public library, a branch of the Cass County Public Library.

Internet culture 
The popular message board website Something Awful was based there in the mid 2010s.

Notable person 
 Allen "Bill" Kennedy, the highly skilled gambler depicted in the book, The Magician and the Cardsharp, by Karl Johnson (Henry Holt, 2005).

References

External links 
 www.pleasanthill.com
 Historic maps of Pleasant Hill in the Sanborn Maps of Missouri Collection at the University of Missouri
 

Cities in Cass County, Missouri
Cities in Missouri